The 2018 Hamilton Tiger-Cats season was the 61st season for the team in the Canadian Football League and their 69th overall. The Tiger-Cats improved upon their 6–12 record from 2017 and clinched a playoff berth and home playoff date during their bye in week 17 following the Montreal Alouettes' loss to the Calgary Stampeders. After defeating the BC Lions in the East Semi-Final, the Tiger-Cats lost to the Ottawa Redblacks in the East Final. This was the third season under general manager Eric Tillman and first full season under head coach June Jones following his interim role the year before.

Offseason

Notable signings 
During the offseason, the Tiger-Cats signed controversial free agent quarterback Johnny Manziel, who played two seasons with the Cleveland Browns in the National Football League (NFL) before being released in 2015 for incidents on and off the field. The Manziel signing was part of a tumultuous negotiation process that lasted over a year.

CFL draft 
The 2018 CFL Draft took place on May 3, 2018. The Tiger-Cats held the first overall draft pick following a trade with the Montreal Alouettes and selected wide receiver Mark Chapman with that pick. This was the first time since the 2013 CFL Draft that they selected first overall. In total, the team had nine selections in the eight-round draft, including four picks in the first 15 selections after trading John Chick to the Edmonton Eskimos and Zach Collaros to the Saskatchewan Roughriders.

Preseason

Schedule

Game summaries

Toronto

at Montreal

Regular season

Season Standings

Season Schedule

Post-season

Schedule

Team

Roster

Coaching staff

References

Hamilton Tiger-Cats seasons
2018 in Ontario
2018 Canadian Football League season by team